Alexandra Amuchechukwu Asogwa  (born 15 February 1996), also known as Alex Unusual is a Nigerian reality tv star, model, compere and actress. She was the third runner up of Big Brother Naija season 3. She is also known for her roles in Nollywood's Merry Men 2, Fate of Alakada and Nucleus.

Background and early life 
Asogwa is from and was born in Nsukka, Enugu State. She has three siblings, one brother and two sisters. She is an alumna of the New York Film Academy. She started her education in Enugu state, obtaining her First School Leaving Certificate in 2006 in Aunty Lizzy International School, Enugu and her secondary education in Federal Government College, Enugu.

She engaged in track and field sports when she was in secondary school and enjoyed the support of her parents in her sporting endeavours. However, according to her in an interview with TheCable, she believes her parents felt she was not taking her academics seriously and yet she still got good grades class, so they changed her school. And as a result of this, she had to repeat the SS1 class, which she disclosed impacted her psychologically. She iterated that this event drove her passion for arts and freedom, ultimately pushing her to drop out from the University in her fourth year where she was pursuing a degree in Agricultural science, to opt to start a fresh degree program in theatre arts. She also revealed that she had an abortion when she was in SS3, at sixteen years old.

Big Brother Nigeria 
In 2017, Asogwa was one of the five finalists of the Big Brother Naija season 3, alongside Miracle, Cee C, Tobi and Nina. She placed as the third runner up. During her stay in the Big brother house, she had a highly publicized disagreement with fellow housemate Cee C, which was subsequently settled during the Big brother reunion show a year later. She was closest to Leo (who is a realtor and named an apartment after her), and after his eviction, she became close to Tobi during the show. She was considered the life of the party during the show because she was a good dancer.

After the show, she stated that her experience in the house thought her "the importance of growth and she came to embrace her own growth as a lady". In an interview with The Punch, she also stated that the show helped her understand people and know what to ignore.

Career 
In 2016, Asogwa contested in the Miss Eastern Nigeria beauty pageant, where she was crowned the winner.

She was also the host of Marvel Studio's red carpet movie premiere of Avengers Endgame in Nigeria. She also served as the event anchor of Lanre Olusola's book launch, alongside fellow actor Deyemi Okanlawon. Asogwa also hosted the red carpet movie premiere of the Merry Men 2 and the Buckwyld and Breathless show 2019.

She made her debut as an actress in the movie Merry Men 2; a 2019 Nigerian crime action comedy film and a sequel to Merry Men: The Real Yoruba Demons that starred Ayo Makun, Jim Iyke, Ufuoma McDermott, Rosaline Meurer and Linda Osifo. She then went on to produce and direct the short film Nucleus in which she also starred, alongside Ngozi Nwosu. She also featured in Power Of 1 and Fate of Alakada.

Endorsements 
Asogwa has signed endorsement deals with some brands including Nestle and Campari. Other brands she has signed with include Jenesis Colony, myPaddi, Eye Doctor's Limited, L'Avyanna Skincare, MFR2019, BisMid.

Filmography

Television

Films

Personal life 
She got a new car from her fans as her 23rd birthday gift. Asogwa suffered depression in 2019 and contemplated suicide several times. She is against cosmetic surgery and believes she can live with any imperfections she thinks she might have. She says she cannot marry a short man, and that she will opt for an artificial insemination if she cannot get married to a tall man. Asogwa commiserates with victims of bullying, urging them to speak up against their oppressors. In 2021, she called off her engagement to her erstwhile fiance because he was physically abusive. According to her social media post, she believes women that get cheated on in marriage is as a result of karma for cheating with other women's husband's when they were single.

See also 

 List of Nigerian actresses

References

External links 
 

Living people
1996 births
Igbo people
Nigerian film actresses
Actresses from Enugu State
Participants in Nigerian reality television series
Big Brother (franchise) contestants
Nigerian television actresses
Nigerian Internet celebrities
Nigerian female models
Nigerian businesspeople
Nigerian women in business
Nigerian television personalities